Rozanne Lejeanne Ridgway (born August 22, 1935) is an American diplomat who served 32 years with the U.S. State Department, holding several posts, including ambassador to Finland and to East Germany, and finished her career as Assistant Secretary of State for European and Canadian Affairs.

Ridgway has been an American foreign policy leader since the Richard Nixon administration. She has acted as an international negotiator on behalf of the United States.

In the early 1970s, Ridgway negotiated longstanding issues over fishing rights in Brazil, Peru and the Bahamas. This led to her appointment in 1976 as the Deputy Assistant Secretary of State for Oceans and Fisheries. During her tenure, she negotiated the 200-mile (370 km) fishing rights treaty. Ridgway's subsequent negotiations led to the return of property of U.S. citizens from Czechoslovakia.

As Special Assistant to the Secretary of State for Negotiations and, subsequently, the Assistant Secretary of State for European and Canadian Affairs, she was the lead negotiator at all four Reagan-Gorbachev summits. These brought the first substantive reductions in nuclear weapons, signaled the beginning of the end of Communism and the Cold War, and established the fundamental realignment of global power as America prepared to enter the twenty-first century.

Between Ridgway's positions at the Department of State, she served as America's Ambassador to Finland from 1977 to 1980 and as the Ambassador to the German Democratic Republic between 1983 and 1985.

She is a member of the following organizations:
 Council on Foreign Relations
 Trilateral Commission
 Bilderberg Group
 National Geographic Society (Trustee)
 Brookings Institution (Trustee)

She was president of the Atlantic Council from 1989 to 1996, and currently the chairwoman of the Baltic-American Freedom Foundation.

In 1998, Ridgway was inducted into the National Women's Hall of Fame.

References

External links
Union Carbid Proxy statement

|-

|-

|-

1935 births
Living people
Ambassadors of the United States to East Germany
20th-century American diplomats
Ambassadors of the United States to Finland
American women ambassadors
Members of the Steering Committee of the Bilderberg Group
Politicians from Saint Paul, Minnesota
Sara Lee Corporation
The Stimson Center
20th-century American businesspeople
United States Foreign Service personnel
20th-century American women
21st-century American women